Peregrin Took, commonly known simply as Pippin, is a fictional character from J. R. R. Tolkien's fantasy novel The Lord of the Rings. He is closely tied with his friend and cousin, Merry Brandybuck, and the two are together during most of the story. Pippin and Merry are introduced as a pair of young hobbits of the Shire who become ensnared in their friend Frodo Baggins's quest to destroy the One Ring. Pippin joins the Fellowship of the Ring. He and Merry become separated from the rest of the group at the breaking of the Fellowship and spend much of The Two Towers with their own story line. Impetuous and curious, Pippin enlists as a soldier in the army of Gondor and fights in the Battle of the Morannon. With the other hobbits, he returns home, helps to lead the Scouring of the Shire, and becomes Thain or hereditary leader of the land.

Commentators have noted that the actions of Merry and Pippin serve to throw light on the characters of the good and bad Germanic lords Théoden of Rohan and Denethor of Gondor, while their simple humour acts as a foil for the higher romance involving kings and the heroic Aragorn.

Fictional history 

Pippin was the only son and heir of Paladin Took II, the aristocratic and independent Thain of the Shire, who farmed at Whitwell near the Three Farthing Stone in the Tookland, and his wife Eglantine Banks. He had three older sisters, Pearl Took, Pimpernel Took, and Pervinca Took. His best friend Meriadoc (Merry) Brandybuck, was his cousin; another good friend was Frodo Baggins.

Pippin was the youngest of the four Hobbits who set out from the Shire, and the only one who had not yet come of age. At Rivendell, Elrond reluctantly chose Merry and Pippin as the last two members of the Company of the Ring.

While crossing the Misty Mountains through the tunnels of Moria, Pippin decided to drop a stone down a deep hole. It seemed to waken something far below, which signalled by tapping with a hammer; Gandalf called Pippin a "fool of a Took". The Company is later pursued by dangerous enemies including orcs, trolls, and a balrog. The Company recuperated in Lothlórien; Pippin was given a brooch by the elf-queen Galadriel. 

After going downriver on the Anduin to Parth Galen with the Fellowship, Merry and Pippin were captured by Orcs. While held captive, he purposefully dropped his elven brooch as a sign for Aragorn, Legolas, and Gimli, who were in pursuit. During a skirmish among his captors, Pippin and Merry escaped, and met the tree-giant Treebeard, leader of the Ents. They roused the Ents against the wizard Saruman and saw his stronghold of Isengard destroyed. Treebeard's "Ent-draught" made Merry and Pippin grow to become the tallest hobbits in history.

Gríma Wormtongue, Saruman's spy among the Rohirrim, threw Saruman's palantír, a stone of seeing, at members of the Company. Pippin, without asking permission, looked into it and saw Sauron himself. To keep Pippin safe from Sauron's forces, the wizard Gandalf took him to the city of Minas Tirith, separating him from his friends. The effect on Sauron was important, as Sauron wrongly assumed that Pippin was the hobbit with the One Ring, and that he was Saruman's prisoner.

In Minas Tirith, Pippin was brought to the city's Steward Denethor, and volunteered to serve him, out of respect for Denethor's son Boromir, who had died trying to defend Merry and Pippin from the Orcs. According to Gandalf, this gesture touched Denethor, who accepted the hobbit's offer and made him one of the Guards of the Citadel. Later, when Denethor despaired and set out to burn his son Faramir and himself alive in the street of tombs, Rath Dínen, Pippin fetched Gandalf, saving Faramir's life.

Pippin was the only hobbit to join the Army of the West, led by Aragorn, as it assaulted the Black Gate of Mordor: this was a feint to distract Sauron from the One Ring's journey towards Mount Doom. During the resulting battle, Pippin killed a troll, who fell on him. Gimli noticed his feet under the troll and dragged him out, saving his life.

Returning home, he and Merry roused the hobbits of the Shire to destroy Saruman's forces during the Scouring of the Shire, achieving greater fame in their homeland than Frodo. He married Diamond of Long Cleeve; they had a son, Faramir. He later became the Took, head of his clan, and Thain of the Shire. Like Merry, he was buried as a hero alongside King Aragorn in Gondor.

Reception 

The critic Jane Chance Nitzsche discusses the role of Pippin and his friend Merry, another hobbit, in illuminating the contrast between the "good and bad Germanic lords Theoden and Denethor". She writes that the two leaders receive the allegiance of a hobbit, but very differently: Denethor, Steward of Gondor, undervalues Pippin because he is small, and binds him with a formal oath, whereas Theoden, King of Rohan, treats Merry with love, which the hobbit responds to.

The Tolkien scholar Tom Shippey notes that Tolkien uses the two hobbits and their low simple humour as foils for the much higher romance to which he was aspiring with the more heroic and kingly figures of Theoden, Denethor, and Aragorn: an unfamiliar and old-fashioned writing style that might otherwise, Shippey writes, have lost his readers entirely. He notes that Pippin and Merry serve, too, as guides to introduce the reader to seeing the various non-human characters, letting the reader know that an ent looks an old tree stump or "almost like the figure of some gnarled old man". The two apparently minor hobbits have another role, too, Shippey writes: it is to remain of good courage when even strong men start to doubt whether victory is possible, as when Pippin comforts the soldier of Gondor, Beregond, as the hordes of Mordor approach Minas Tirith.

A fourth purpose, notes the Tolkien critic Paul Kocher, is given by Tolkien himself, in the words of the wizard Gandalf: "the young hobbits ... were brought to Fangorn, and their coming was like the falling of small stones that starts an avalanche in the mountains." Kocher observes that Tolkien is describing Merry and Pippin's role in the same terms as he spells out Gollum's purpose and Gandalf's "reincarnation"; in Kocher's words, the "finger of Providence" can be glimpsed: "All are filling roles written for them by the same great playwright."

Gregory Bassham and Eric Bronson's The Hobbit and Philosophy notes that Pippin, who starts out on the quest playful and childish, is radically, and in their view unusually for Tolkien rapidly, altered by his experience of seeing Sauron in the palantír: before it he is "thoughtless and immature"; the "terrifying encounter" shocks him into a "rapid ethical makeover".

Adaptations 

In Ralph Bakshi's 1978 animated version of The Lord of the Rings, Pippin was voiced by Dominic Guard. In the 1980 Rankin/Bass animated version of The Return of the King, made for television, the character was voiced by Sonny Melendrez. In the 1981 BBC radio serial of The Lord of the Rings, Pippin was played by John McAndrew. Jari Pehkonen played Peregrin Took in the 1993 Finnish miniseries Hobitit. In Peter Jackson's The Lord of the Rings film trilogy, Pippin is played by Scottish actor Billy Boyd.

Notes

References

Primary 
This list identifies each item's location in Tolkien's writings.

Secondary

Sources

External links

Middle-earth Hobbits
The Lord of the Rings characters
Fictional swordfighters
Literary characters introduced in 1954
Male characters in literature
Male characters in film

de:Figuren in Tolkiens Welt#Peregrin Tuk